is a passenger railway station located in the city of Uwajima, Ehime Prefecture, Japan. It is operated by JR Shikoku and has the station number "U25".

Lines
Only local trains serve the station. Connections with other services are needed to travel further east of Matsuyama on the line.

In addition, the Uwakai limited express also stops at the station.

Layout
The station consists of two opposed side platforms serving two tracks. A station building, which is now unstaffed, serves as a waiting room. Access to the opposite platform is by means of a footbridge.

Adjacent stations

History
The Uwajima Line and its stations, including Iyo-Yoshida, then became part of the Yosan Mainline from that date. At that time, the station was operated by Japanese Government Railways (JGR), later becoming Japanese National Railways (JNR). With the privatization of JNR on 1 April 1987, control of the station passed to JR Shikoku.

Surrounding area
 Yoshida Bay
 Uwajima City Yoshida Branch (former Yoshida Town Hall)
 Ehime Prefectural Yoshida High School

See also
 List of railway stations in Japan

References

External links
 Station timetable

Railway stations in Ehime Prefecture
Railway stations in Japan opened in 1941
Uwajima, Ehime